Arkowyen (also Romanized as Arkovīn and Arkevīn; also known as Arkovī and Arkawi) is a village in Shamsabad Rural District, in the Central District of Arak County, Markazi Province, Iran. At the 2006 census, its population was 239, in 71 families.

References 

Populated places in Arak County